Obscure is a survival horror video game developed by Hydravision Entertainment and published by DreamCatcher Interactive in North America, Ubisoft in China and MC2-Microïds in other territories for Microsoft Windows, PlayStation 2 and Xbox. It was released on October 1, 2004 in Europe and on April 6, 2005 in North America.

Story
Strange things are happening at Leafmore High. Three teenagers set out to search for their missing friend. Finding themselves locked inside the school overnight, they now have to get to the bottom of the strange occurrences.
 
The player controls the five teenagers as they explore the school and battle a number of different types of infected students. The students discover that the enemies are sensitive to light, with direct sunlight being able to destroy them. Flashlights help to slightly weaken their foes and the malevolent black aura surrounding them.
 
The students discover a conspiracy involving injections turning students into mutated monsters, mostly experimentations based on a rare plant spore, with the possibility to allow people to live forever. It is discovered that the nurse, Elisabeth, and principal, Herbert, are over 100 years old but seem only to be in their 60s, thanks to the tests they performed on each other.
 
The students later come across Herbert, who is killed by a teacher seeking to cure himself of the infection caused by Herbert's experiments. Herbert's twin, Leonard, sees his dead brother and becomes angry. He murders the teacher and then leaves the teenagers to defeat the biggest mutant seen yet.
 
After defeating him, they return to the gym and inject themselves with the cure. However, Leonard returns and after a battle, Leonard gives into the sunlight and everything is back to normal.

Player characters
Obscure gives players the ability to control and switch between any of five playable characters. As the player directly controls only one character at a time, the other characters will be computer-controlled, or a second player can join in at any time.

 Josh Carter (voiced by Sam Riegel) - A shy and reserved reporter for the school paper. He can tell if there is anything left to do in an area, such as items to pick up, or locations that advance the storyline.
 Stanley Jones (voiced by Scott Haze) - A stoner who does drugs, and is good friends with Josh and Kenny. He is a thief and computer hacker. He is able to pick locks easier and break into rooms.
 Kenny Matthews (voiced by Liam O'Brien) - He is the varsity athlete, and Shannon's older brother.
 Shannon Matthews (voiced by Stephanie Sheh) - Kenny's smart younger sister. Shannon dresses provocatively to take the focus away from her intelligence. She provides tips on puzzles and heals wounds. She is able to heal 20% more with a normal health item.
 Ashley Thompson (voiced by Tara Platt) - She is a cheerleader, and Kenny's girlfriend. She has the ability to rapid fire a pistol, and deals more damage with most weapons.
Dan - He is a student and the first human Kenny comes across inside a room in the basement. His health is critically low due to being a test subject. He ends up being killed very quickly by a monster when he and Kenny attempt to escape together, and his death cannot be prevented.

Gameplay
Obscure has a two-player cooperative mode that allows the player to complete the campaign with a friend. The game also allows players to combine items, for example taping a flashlight to any firearm. Some critics, including X-Play, have stated that this was the only redeeming quality, and mocked id's Doom 3 for not implementing such a concept.

While each character has special abilities, none of them are necessary to complete the game. Each character can perform the same physical acts even if it takes some characters longer and/or more effort than others. If any characters die during the adventure, the player may simply continue with those remaining.

Reception

The game received "mixed or average reviews" on all platforms according to the review aggregation website Metacritic.

Sequels and future

Obscure II takes place two years later. The kids who survived are now at college living normal lives. They discover a strange plant on campus and things start going awry. The game was released for Microsoft Windows, PlayStation 2, Wii and PlayStation Portable. The franchise was abruptly halted due to the closure of Hydravision Entertainment, who had intended to do a sequel and possibly a prequel.

However, Final Exam is a spinoff of the series and was released for PlayStation Network, Xbox Live and Microsoft Windows in 2013.

In 2016, a high definition remaster of Obscure and its sequel was re-released on Steam featuring Steam achievements, leaderboards and community support. This version of Obscure removed music from Sum 41 due to the rights being lost.

References

External links
  at Microids (archived from the original )
 

2004 video games
Adventure games
Cooperative video games
High school-themed video games
2000s horror video games
PlayStation 2 games
School-themed video games
Third-person shooters
Video games developed in France
Video games featuring female protagonists
Video games scored by Olivier Deriviere
Windows games
Xbox games
Multiplayer and single-player video games
RenderWare games
DreamCatcher Interactive games
Hydravision Entertainment games